Pierre Jean Van Stabel (8 November 1744 in Dunkirk – 30 March 1797 in Dunkirk) was a French naval officer and rear-admiral, famous for his role in the Glorious First of June.

Career 
Van Stabel was born to a family of sailors and started a career in the merchant navy at the age of fourteen, steadily rosing to the rank of sea captain. In 1778, with the intervention of France in the American Revolutionary War, Van Stabel enlisted in the French Royal Navy as an auxiliary officer.

Service on Rohan Soubise 

Van Stabel took command of the privateer Dunkerquoise In 1781, he was in command of the 22-gun corvette Rohan Soubise, formerly the privateer Comtesse d'Artois purchased into service on 27 April 1781.

Commanding Rohan Soubise, Van Stabel captured the British privateer Admiral-Rodney after a one-hour battle, in which he was twice wounded by musket bullets to the throat, relinquishing command of his ship just long enough to have the bullets removed from him body. Too damaged in the battle to be taken as a prize, the privateer was then scuttled by fire. King Louis XVI had a silver sword presented to him in recognition.

Van Stabel later commanded another privateer, the Robecq.

Service as captain the Channel 
In 1782, Van Stabel was promoted to frigate lieutenant, and tasked with escort duty in the English Channel, on various small warships.

In 1787, Van Stabel was tasked with ferrying four large barges from Boulogne to Brest.

In 1788, he conducted a hydrographic survey of the coasts of the English Channel; he was given command of the lugger Fanfaron.

Promoted to ensign in 1792, he took command of the frigate Proserpine, on which he left a one-year campaign in the Caribbean and Saint-Domingue.

In February 1793, with the outbreak of the War of the First Coalition, Van Stabel was promoted to captain, and appointed to command the frigate Thétis. He departed Brestin in April and led a four-month campaign in the English Channel, capturing around forty British merchantmen.

Service as rear-admiral the Channel 
In November of the same year, Van Stabel was promoted to rear-admiral, and took command of a division comprising six ships of the line, with his flag on the 74-gun Tigre; the other ships were the 74-gun Jean Bart, Tourville, Impétueux, Aquilon and Révolution, with a screening force comprising the frigates Insurgente and Sémillante, and the brigs Ballon and Espiègle.

On 16 November, the division departed Brest to intercept a British convoy in the Channel. Instead of the convoy and its expected four-ship escort under Sir John Jervis, Van Stabel's division met a 28-ship squadron under Admiral Howe. Van Stabel ordered a retreat, but Sémillantes inferior nautical qualities made her lag behind the division, and she was soon overhauled by a British frigate; Van Stabel sailed Tigre independently to rescue her, and in the course of a chase that lasted several days, managed to pry seventeen merchantmen for the convoy without granting Howe a head-on engagement before returning to Brest. Only Espiègle was captured by two frigates on the 29th.

Atlantic campaign of May 1794 
Later than year, Van Stabel was tasked with escorting a food convoy gathered by Captain Émeriau, of the frigate Embuscade,  from the Chesapeake to France. The convoy departed in April, counting 170 ships. The pursuit of the convoy of the Royal Navy was the focus of the Atlantic campaign of May 1794 which culminated with the battle of the Glorious First of June. The convoy arrived at the scene of the battle on 3 June and found the debris left by the battle; Van Stabel considered whether to keep his route for fear that the British fleet might ambush him, but decided that the quantity of wreckage was a sign that both fleets had had to return to harbour. He continued on, and eventually reached Brest unharmed on 13 June, without losing any ship, and having augmented his convoy with forty prizes. The National Convention voted a decree that Van Stabel had Bien mérité de la Patrie.

During the Croisière du Grand Hiver, Van Stabel commanded the light squadron of Villaret-Joyeuse's fleet, he lost none of this ships.

Later service 
In 1796, the French Directory decided to reopen the shipping lines on the Scheldt, and tasked Van Stabel to lead two brigs and four gunboats to escort eight merchantmen to Antwerp (six French and two Swedish). Van Stabel managed to sail by several Dutch forts without engaging them.

Van Stabel then returned to Vlissingen to conduct patrols in the North Sea at the head of a division comprising four frigates and a number of corvettes. However, his declining health forced him to return to Dunkirk, where he died soon after of a chest disease.

Notes and references

Notes

References

Bibliography

External links 

 Amiral Pierre VANSTABEL, la Préparation Militaire Marine de Dunkerque par Jean BOUGER

French Navy admirals
People from Dunkirk
1744 births
1797 deaths
Dunkirk Privateers